Nkosikhona Nofuma (born 29 April 1988) is a South African professional rugby union player for the  in the Currie Cup and in the Rugby Challenge. He can play as a flanker, number eight or lock.

Career

Griffons

Despite being born in the Eastern Cape, Nofuma went to school in Welkom. He was selected to represent the Welkom-based  rugby province at the Under-18 Academy Week in 2005 and then played for a Griffons Country Districts side at the same competition in 2006.

After high school, he continued to progress through age-group rugby at the Griffons; he played for the Griffons U19s in the 2007 Under-19 Provincial Championship and for the Griffons U21s in the 2009 Under-21 Provincial Championship. However, he failed to break into their senior squad.

UFH Blues

In 2011, Nofuma represented the rugby team of Alice-based university side University of Fort Hare in the Varsity Shield competitions in 2011, 2012 and 2013. He scored four tries for them during the 2013 edition, getting a brace in their match against  and one each in their matches against  and eventual champions .

Border Bulldogs

He was one of several amateur players brought into the  provincial set-up at the start of 2014 after the professional side was declared bankrupt. He was included in their squad for the 2014 Vodacom Cup competition and made his debut in their First Round match against , suffering a 24–46 defeat.

He made one more appearance during the qualification series, but the Border Bulldogs lost all six of their matches, failing to qualify for the 2014 Currie Cup Premier Division, instead qualifying to the 2014 Currie Cup First Division. The Border Bulldogs ended the competition bottom of the log with a single win all season.

References

South African rugby union players
Living people
1988 births
People from Mhlontlo Local Municipality
Rugby union locks
Rugby union flankers
Rugby union number eights
Border Bulldogs players
Griffons (rugby union) players
SWD Eagles players
Rugby union players from the Eastern Cape